Shikhong Sekmai is a city and a municipal council in Thoubal district in the Indian state of Manipur. Shikhong Bazar is the main commercial center of Shikhong Sekmai locality and its surrounding villages.

Demographics
 India census, Sikhong Sekmai had a population of 7,390. Males constitute 49% of the population and females 51%. Sikhong Sekmai has an average literacy rate of 69.68 %: male literacy is 79.55 %, and female literacy is 59.94 %. In Sikhong Sekmai, 13.82 % of the population is under 6 years of age.

References

Cities and towns in Thoubal district
Thoubal